Gertruda Kilosówna (9 February 1913 – 4 December 1938) was a Polish middle-distance runner. She competed in the women's 800 metres at the 1928 Summer Olympics.

She died from throat cancer.

References

External links
 

1913 births
1938 deaths
Athletes (track and field) at the 1928 Summer Olympics
Polish female middle-distance runners
Olympic athletes of Poland
Sportspeople from Ruda Śląska
Deaths from throat cancer
Deaths from cancer in Poland
20th-century Polish women